Orixa may refer to:

Orixa (plant), a genus of plants in the family Rutaceae
Orixa (moth), the synonym of a genus of moths in the family Erebidae
Orixa (band), an alternative rock band
Orixa or orisha, family of spirits